Kettle Moraine High School (KMHS) is a secondary school located in Wales, Wisconsin. It is a part of the Kettle Moraine School District.

It is accredited by the North Central Association of Colleges and Schools (NCA CASI). Kettle Moraine was named a National Blue Ribbon School of Excellence in 2002 by the U.S. Department of Education.

Attendance boundary
The district (of which KM High is the sole comprehensive high school), mostly in Waukesha County, includes all of Dousman, almost all of Wales, much of Delafield, a portion of Summit, and a small portion of North Prairie. The Waukesha County portion includes sections of the towns of Genesee and Ottawa. A portion of the district extends into the town of Sullivan, in Jefferson County.

Charter schools
The Kettle Moraine High School campus contains three charter schools in addition to the regular school, nicknamed Legacy.  Charter school students may participate in any extracurricular activities, including sports, open to Legacy students.

KM Global, founded in 2011, uses seminars, field trips, and internships to teach a global perspective and leadership. Global blends elements of traditional high school with that of cyber schools.

KM Perform, founded in 2011, teaches music, art, creative writing, and theater through workshops and seminars while students take math and science classes online or through Legacy.

The High School of Health Sciences (HSHS, HS2), founded in 2014, partners with Prohealth Care, Aurora Medical Center-Summit, and Medical College of Wisconsin to teach about biology and healthcare through hands-on experience.

Extracurricular activities

Clubs 
KM hosted the regional DECA competition on January 10, 2009.

Other clubs include: Academic Decathlon, Aikido Club, Best Buddies, Bowling Club, Campaigners, Caretakers for the Environment, Chess Club, Chamber Singers, Chinese Club, Diversity Club, Drama Club, FTC Robotics team, FRC Robotics team, French Club, Gender/Sexuality Alliance, German Club, Global Action, Intramural Sports, Interact, Lacrosse Club, Laser Jazz, Marching Band, Math team, Meditation Club, Mock Trial team, Model UN, Pro-Life club, Rock Climbing Team, Spanish Club, SMART Team, Unity club, and YAF (Young Americans for Freedom).

Athletics 
Kettle Moraine supports 15 boys' and 12 girls' interscholastic athletic programs in the Classic 8 Conference.
After winning a State Championship in football in 2022, the Lasers have officially been dubbed a football school. 
Kettle Moraine won the WIAA state team championships in boys' cross country (1970), baseball-summer (1988), football (1988 and 2022), girls' basketball (1999), boys' track (2008), and boys' lacrosse (2016, 2017, and 2019).

Notable alumni
David Koepp – director and screenwriter
Joe Randa – former Major League Baseball player

References

External links
Kettle Moraine High School

Public high schools in Wisconsin
Schools in Waukesha County, Wisconsin
Educational institutions established in 1965
1965 establishments in Wisconsin